The list of current and past Rajya Sabha members from the Nagaland State. The state elects 1 member for a term of 6 years indirectly elected by the state legislators, since year 1964.

List of all Rajya Sabha members from Nagaland state 
Source:

References

External links
Rajya Sabha homepage hosted by the Indian government
List of Sitting Members of Rajya Sabha (Term-Wise) 
Members of Rajya Sabha (State-wise Retirement List)

Nagaland
 
Rajya Sabha